Pampadumpara  is a village in Idukki district in the Indian state of Kerala. Cardamom Research Institute is located in Pampadumpara.

Demographics
 India census, Pampadumpara had a population of 16600 with 8295 males and 8305 females. The population includes people from Kerala as well as the neighboring state Tamil Nadu.

Etymology
The origin of the city's name is steeped in natural specialties of this area. The name Pampadumpara is composed of three local language words. That are Pamp means Snake, Aadum means Dance and Para means Rock. As a whole the meaning of the name Pampadumpara is snakes dancing rock. Legend says in this area there were many snakes who danced atop the rocks and thus the name becomes Pampadumpara. It is believed that a lot of tribes were once lived here, and they gave this name.

Ethnic Groups and Communities
The Pampadumpara has people of three religions – Hindu, Christian and Muslim. Along with native and migrated Keralites, there are many people of Tamil origin as well. Most of the people are either migrants from southern states of Kerala, especially Kottayam, Pathanamthitta, Alapuzha and Kollam.

Geography and Economy
Pampadumpara is a beautiful hilly area with its plantations of cardamom, pepper, coffee, tea, ginger, etc. Thus the economy of this area is derived from the geographical features of this village. Cardamom is the most  suitable plant for cultivation and it grows in more than 60% of the total area. The latest trend of this village is to find a way to attract the nature loving tourist to their own homes for a short stay. The climate is usually cold with a temperature varying from 16° Celsius to 30° Celsius.

Transport
Road transportation is only available mode of transportation.
The nearest airports are Nedumbassery Airport, Kochi and Madhurai Airport Tamil Nadu. Nearest railway stations are Kottayam and Aluva.

Education
Pampadumpara is a 100% literate village. The present trend of education in this area is at least the school completion of +2. Also there are people who completed their Masters considers agriculture as the best means of wealth and taking care of the plantations. The village is found on the way from Thekkady to Munnar so many tourist are passing this way.

References

Villages in Idukki district